Ĵ or ĵ (J circumflex) is a letter in Esperanto orthography representing the sound .

While Esperanto orthography uses a diacritic for its four postalveolar consonants, as do the Latin-based Slavic alphabets, the base letters are Romano-Germanic. Ĵ is based on the French pronunciation of the letter j to better preserve the shape of borrowings from that language (such as ĵurnalo from journal) than Slavic ž would.

Ĵ is used in the Persian Latin (Rumi) alphabet, equivalent to ژ.

Usage

In mathematics
 The letter ĵ is often used to denote a unit vector in mathematics and physics for representing y-vector.

Character mappings

See also
 Ĉ
 Ĝ
 Ĥ
 Ŝ
 Ŭ

References

Esperanto letters with diacritics
Latin letters with diacritics